Yahia Kaidum was the Algerian minister for health and population in the 1995 government of Mokdad Sifi.

References

Living people
Year of birth missing (living people)
Place of birth missing (living people)
20th-century Algerian politicians
Health ministers of Algeria